A balance puzzle is a mathematical puzzle which challenges the solver to distribute a subset of numbers so that the several sides of a stylized diagram representing a balance scale are equal.  The balance puzzle is a classical number puzzle in the World Puzzle Championship.
It consists of a mobile or tree structure, with designated positions where the player must hang specified weights, so that everything balances.
See examples below.

There are usually 8 to 12 consecutive numbers (weights) to place, which makes it much smaller than, for example, sudoku.

As in many mathematical puzzles, the solution is unique.
Expert puzzlers often prefer puzzles where the rules explicitly states that there is only one solution.
This property allows for some reasoning strategies.
It also makes generating puzzles a bit more difficult.

Examples 

 Weight Puzzles

Variants 
 Balloon balance: same puzzle but with negatives weights also to be placed. example

Puzzles